These are the official results of the Women's discus throw event at the 1986 European Championships in Stuttgart, West Germany, held at Neckarstadion on 28 August 1986.

Medalists

Final

Participation
According to an unofficial count, 14 athletes from 10 countries participated in the event.

 (1)
 (2)
 (3)
 (1)
 (1)
 (1)
 (1)
 (1)
 (2)
 (1)

See also
 1982 Women's European Championships Discus Throw (Athens)
 1983 Women's World Championships Discus Throw (Helsinki)
 1984 Women's Olympic Discus Throw (Los Angeles)
 1987 Women's World Championships Discus Throw (Rome)
 1988 Women's Olympic Discus Throw (Seoul)
 1990 Women's European Championships Discus Throw (Split)

References

 Results

Discus throw
Discus throw at the European Athletics Championships
1986 in women's athletics